Randal D. Haworth, (born September 19, 1961) is a Beverly Hills plastic surgeon recognized for his leading role in reality TV series The Swan. Haworth is also an artist, having recently exhibited his Iconography series of paintings in both Los Angeles and Boca Raton, Florida.

Early life
Haworth was born in Los Angeles as an only child.

Education
Haworth graduated Alpha Omega Alpha from the University of Southern California School of Medicine in 1988. He then completed a five year surgical residency at New York Hospital/ Cornell University Medical Center in 1993. Haworth served as Chief Resident during his plastic surgery residency at UCLA, where he gained extensive experience in the sub-specialties of aesthetic, micro-, pediatric, and hand surgery. During this time, he earned the title of Plastic Surgical Consultant of the Year for 1993-94. Upon completing his training, Haworth established his office and surgical center on Bedford Drive in Beverly Hills where he currently practices. Haworth is board certified by the American Board of Plastic Surgery, and a Fellow of the American College of Surgeons.

Career
Haworth has published multiple articles in plastic and general surgical journals where he details technical advances in cosmetic surgery. A recent publication from June 2004 in Plastic and Reconstructive Surgery, describes Haworth's innovations in permanent lip augmentation as well as the F.A.T.M.A. technique that he invented.  Another article in Cosmetic Surgery Times  details his experience in midface lifts utilizing the Endotine B midface device from Coapt.  Among Haworth's areas of expertise are rhinoplasty (including revising previously operated upon noses that have been disfigured), facial rejuvenation and breast surgery. The Swan television show centered on Haworth's ability to transform a very plain appearance into beautiful one, while maintaining a natural look. Haworth has been frequently profiled in print media, including Los Angeles Magazine, The New York Times, and The Wall Street Journal, as well as on television (Entertainment Tonight, Larry King, MSNBC). In 1998, Los Angeles magazine nominated him as one of L.A.'s top 8 plastic surgeons, while in 2005, LA Confidential magazine named him as one of the 2 best plastic surgeons in Los Angeles.

Art
Haworth began hand-drawing medical illustrations for medical journal articles in 1981.  He was inspired by master medical illustrator Max Broedel of Johns Hopkins University.  His illustrations were published in multiple journals, including Plastic and Reconstructive Surgery, Annals of Plastic Surgery, Trauma Quarterly, and Hand Clinics.

Haworth's illustrations crossed over into fine art when in August 2000, he had his first solo art show entitled "Memories Lost" at the BGH Gallery/Bergamot Station in Santa Monica, California. The body of work comprised photorealistic drawings of missing children and adults.  A more recent series of rendered acrylic paintings was entitled "Iconography"  which focused on reflecting modern culture through anachronistic figurative images. This show was staged at The James Gray Gallery in Santa Monica (August 2006), the Karen Lynne Gallery in Beverly Hills (November 2006), and Caesarea Gallery   in Boca Raton, Florida (February 2007).  Art critic Peter Frank called it 'anti-Pop Realism' stating that his art 'synthesizes classic style with Pop Surrealism.'"

Filmography
20 Best and Worst Celebrity Plastic Surgery Stories (2009) (self)
Porcelain (2008) (self)
The Swan (2004–05) (self)
Larry King Live (2005) (medical expert)
On-Air with Ryan Seacrest (4 May 2004) (self)
Anderson Cooper 360° (self) 2 April 2004 (2004)

Publications
Haworth RD: How to Achieve a Reliable Midface Lift. Cosmetic Surgery Times  8:8,  2005
Haworth RD: Customizing Perioral Enhancement to Obtain Ideal Lip Aesthetics: Combining Both Lip Voluming and Reshaping Procedures Following an Algorithmic Approach . Plast Reconstr Surg 113:2182, 2004
Rosenberg PH, Haworth RD, Heier L, et al.: The Role of the Cranial Base in Facial Growth; Experimental Craniofacial Synostosis in the Rabbit. Plast Reconstr Surg 99:1396, 1997
Haworth RD: Dispelling Congenital Confusion. Parents 1:1 Dec 1995
Munshi IA, Haworth RD, Barie PS: Resolution of Refractory Pancreatic Ascites Treated after Continuous Infusion of Octreotide Acetate. Pancreas. Int J  Pancreatology 17:67 1995
Leipziger LS, Schnapp DS, Haworth RD, et al.: Facial Skeletal Growth After Timed Soft Tissue Undermining. Plast Reconstr Surg 89: 809, 1992
LaTrenta GS, Grant RT, Haworth RD, et al.: Functional Reconstruction for Severe Post-Burn Microstomia: A Case Report. Ann Plast Surg 29: 178, 1992
Haworth RD, Rosenberg PH, Hoffman LA, et al.: The Anterior Microsurgical Approach to the Cranial Base in the Rabbit.  Laboratory Animal 26: 196, 1992

References

External links 
 Dr. Haworth's Official Website

People from Beverly Hills, California
American plastic surgeons
Keck School of Medicine of USC alumni
Medical educators
Haworth, Dr. Randal
Living people
1961 births
Physicians from California
Artists from California
People from Los Angeles